St Vincent County was one of the original Nineteen Counties in New South Wales and is now one of the 141 Cadastral divisions of New South Wales. It included the south coast area encompassing Batemans Bay, Ulladulla, Jervis Bay and inland to Braidwood. The Shoalhaven River is the boundary to the north and west, and the Deua River the boundary to the south.

St. Vincent County was named in honour of John Jervis, 1st Earl of St Vincent (1735-1823), Admiral of the Fleet. The electoral district of United Counties of Murray and St Vincent and the electoral district of St Vincent were the first electoral districts for the area, between 1856 and 1859.

Parishes within this county
Land in the Parishes of Bherwerre, Beecroft, Farnham and Nowra was transferred to the Commonwealth government in 1915 to become the Jervis Bay Territory, as specified in the Seat of Government Acceptance Act 1909. A full list of parishes found within this county; their current LGA and mapping coordinates to the approximate centre of each location is as follows:

References

Counties of New South Wales